Cody is a city in Northwest Wyoming and the seat of government of Park County, Wyoming, United States. It is named after Buffalo Bill Cody for his part in the founding of Cody in 1896.

The population was 10,066 at the 2020 census. Cody is served by Yellowstone Regional Airport.

Geography
Cody is located at  (44.523244, −109.057109).

Cody's elevation is approximately 5016 ft (1,500 m) above sea level. The main part of the city is split across three levels, separated by about 60 feet (18 m).

The Shoshone River flows through Cody in a canyon. The other two are west of town; one allows access to the East Gate of Yellowstone National Park, and the other is used by fishermen in Shoshone Canyon and as access to the Buffalo Bill Dam.

Cody is located at the western edge of the Bighorn Basin, a depression surrounded by the Big Horn, Owl Creek, Bridger, and Absaroka ranges. At the western edge of Cody, a deep canyon formed by the Shoshone River provides the only passage to Yellowstone's Eastern Entrance. At its mouth and rising above Cody are Rattlesnake Mountain on the north side and Cedar Mountain on the south side.

Climate 
Cody experiences a semi-arid climate (Köppen BSk), with highly variable conditions. Summers are warm, with some heat spells pushing temperatures above . Winters are cold, with frigid periods alternating with sometimes milder temperatures. Relative humidity is usually a fairly dry 30% or less. Precipitation averages  annually, including  of snow per season. Cody enjoys about 300 days of sunshine per year.

Wind is almost a constant presence in the Cody area. Air flow in Cody area is turbulent, but during the winter most storms move in from the north-northwest. During the summer, it is not unusual to see storms move in from the southwest. Throughout a normal day, winds can be experienced as coming from almost any direction, mostly from the north and west, but sometimes from the south and east. The Canyon at the west end of Cody funnels rain and wind across the city from the west.

Because of the dry climate, the entire area is laced with irrigation canals, holding ponds, laterals, and drops. This reservoir (among others) feeds the Shoshone Project, a large irrigation water distribution system.

There are an average of 72.3 days with measurable precipitation.

Culture 

Themes surrounding Cody's pioneer and Cowboy and Western history are common in the cultural events and activities in the area.

The Buffalo Bill Center of the West is a large and modern facility located near the center of the city. It contains five museums in one, including the Draper Natural History Museum, the Plains Indian Museum, the Cody Firearms Museum, the Whitney Western Art Museum and the Buffalo Bill Museum which chronicles the life of William F. Cody, for whom the historical center is named. The historical center maintains large collections. It is a favorite stopping point for tourists passing through the town, on their way to or from Yellowstone.

Old Trail Town, a restoration of more than 25 historic Western buildings and artifacts, is located in Cody just off the Yellowstone Highway.

Rodeo is important in the culture in Cody, which calls itself the "Rodeo Capital of the World". The Cody Nite Rodeo is an amateur rodeo every night from June 1 through August 31.

Cody is also host to the Cody Stampede Rodeo. The Stampede is a Professional Rodeo Cowboys Association rodeo and is one of the largest rodeos in the nation that is held over the Independence Day Holiday. Many of the top cowboys in the country attend. The stampede has been held from July 1–4 every year since 1919. Cody hosts the Cody Stampede, a weeklong series of events around the 4th of July, featuring several parades where the main street is blocked off, rodeos, fireworks and more. In 2019 Cody Stampede celebrated its 100th year.

The Heart Mountain Relocation Center, was a War Relocation Camp where 14,000 Japanese Americans were interned during World War II (Internment of Japanese Americans). The Interpretive Center is approximately 17 miles east of town and includes surviving buildings from the camp, a war memorial, a walking trail, and a world-class museum.

Arts

Cody is also a bustling arts town.

Visual Arts are celebrated and displayed within the Buffalo Bill Center of the West, Whitney Western Arts Museum as well as many other collective local/regional galleries around town such as the Cody Country Art League, By Western Hands and more. Many photographers, painters, sculptors, designers, and artists love to capture the surrounding natural wonder and western aesthetics.

For nearly twenty years Cody has also been the home to the Rendezvous Royale art festival. The week-long festival includes the Buffalo Bill Art Show and Sale, a nationally renowned art show that features a wide range of interpretations of western art from emerging artists and contemporary masters. Rendezvous Royale features the art show sale, lectures, workshops, and a patrons ball.

The live music scene in Cody is especially vibrant in the summer when the City of Cody hosts an annual Concert in the Park series, The Cody Cattle Company does a nightly show, Dan Miller's Cowboy Music Revue is up and running, and several bars in town host touring artists.

Cody is also the home to several theatre and dance companies that promote community theatre and dance education from pre-k through high school. These companies produce many seasonal projects as well as annual productions as well. Throughout the year various dance recitals from the companies, as well as musical theatre and theatre production from community members are produced and performed. The annual performing arts events in Cody are produced from The Rocky Mountain Dance Theatre. They have been doing The Nutcracker annually in December for 25 years, and The Wild West Spectacular Musical for seven seasons.

Education
Public education in the city of Cody is provided by Park County School District #6. Three elementary schools – Eastside, Glenn Livingston, and Sunset - serve students in grades kindergarten through five. The district's two secondary campuses are Cody Middle School (grades 6-8) and Cody High School (grades 9-12).

Cody has a public library, a branch of the Park County Library System.

Industry 

The primary industry in Cody is tourism. Hotels, restaurants and shops cater to travelers coming to visit the West and Yellowstone Park. Cody has several art galleries, with some notable local painters and artists living in the area.

Cody is fast becoming a hub for outdoor recreation. The Shoshone River runs through town offering class I-V kayaking and whitewater rafting. Shoshone Canyon offers over 300 rock climbing routes, while Cedar Mountain boasts nearly 600 boulder problems. Cody hosts nearly 50 miles of single track, with a large amount of it accessible by bike from town. A bike park was recently completed with jump and drop lines as well as a pump track. Skiing, both downhill and cross-country are very popular sports in Cody, with the local High School boasting competitive cross-country and downhill ski teams. Sleeping Giant Ski Area & Zipline, about and hour west of Cody, is a popular local downhill ski mountain, in close proximity Yellowstone East Entrance.

Another industry is western style furniture, with several small furniture makers producing custom pieces.

The oil industry seems to wax and wane over the years in the Cody area. Husky Energy was founded in Cody in 1938 (as Husky Refining Company), when Glenn Nielson purchased the assets of Park Refining Company, started four years earlier by area oil developer Valentine M. Kirk. Husky operated as refinery until 1980s, the facility being demolished in the 1990s.

Just to the south of Cody are large deposits of gypsum.

Park County School District #6 is another large employer in the area.

Demographics

2010 census
As of the census of 2010, there were 9,520 people, 4,278 households, and 2,502 families living in the city. The racial makeup of the city was 95.9% White, 0.2% African American, 0.7% Native American, 0.4% Asian, 0.1% Pacific Islander, 1.0% from other races, and 1.8% from two or more races. Hispanic or Latino residents of any race were 3.1% of the population.

There were 4,278 households, of which 26.5% had children under the age of 18 living with them, 45.0% were married couples living together, 9.5% had a female householder with no husband present, 4.0% had a male householder with no wife present, and 41.5% were non-families. 34.8% of all households were made up of individuals, and 13.2% had someone living alone who was 65 years of age or older. The average household size was 2.19 and the average family size was 2.82.

The median age in the city was 42.4 years. 21.8% of residents were under the age of 18; 7.1% were between the ages of 18 and 24; 24.1% were from 25 to 44; 28.9% were from 45 to 64; and 18.2% were 65 years of age or older. The gender makeup of the city was 48.2% male and 51.8% female.

2000 census
As of the census of 2000, there were 8,835 people, 3,791 households, and 2,403 families living in the city. The population density was 952.3 people per square mile (367.6/km2). There were 4,113 housing units at an average density of 443.3 per square mile (171.1/km2). The racial makeup of the city was 96.90% White, 0.10% African American, 0.42% Native American, 0.58% Asian, 0.05% Pacific Islander, 0.85% from other races, and 1.11% from two or more races. Hispanic or Latino of any race were 2.22% of the population.

There were 3,791 households, out of which 29.0% had children under the age of 18 living with them, 50.7% were married couples living together, 9.5% had a female householder with no husband present, and 36.6% were non-families. 32.2% of all households were made up of individuals, and 12.4% had someone living alone who was 65 years of age or older. The average household size was 2.27 and the average family size was 2.86.

In the city, the population was spread out, with 24.8% under the age of 18, 7.2% from 18 to 24, 26.4% from 25 to 44, 24.9% from 45 to 64, and 16.6% who were 65 years of age or older. The median age was 40 years. For every 100 females, there were 90.9 males. For every 100 females age 18 and over, there were 88.1 males.

The median income for a household in the city was $34,450, and the median income for a family was $40,554. Males had a median income of $31,395 versus $19,947 for females. The per capita income for the city was $17,813. About 9.4% of families and 13.9% of the population were below the poverty line, including 19.3% of those under age 18 and 11.0% of those age 65 or over.

Government
Cody is governed via a city council and mayor. The mayor is elected in a citywide vote. The city council consists of six members who are elected from one of three wards. Each ward elects two members.

Media

AM Radio
 KZMQ (AM) 1140 (Country), Big Horn Radio Network
 KPOW 1260 (Country), MGR Media LLC
 KODI 1400 (News/Talk), Big Horn Radio Network

FM Radio
 KOFG 91.1 (Religious), Gospel Messengers
 KUWP 90.1 (Wyoming Public Radio and NPR), University of Wyoming
 KTAG 97.9 (Adult Contemporary), Big Horn Radio Network
 KZMQ-FM 100.3 (Country), Big Horn Radio Network
 KROW 101.1  (Rock), White Park Broadcasting
 KBEN-FM 103.3 (Classic Country), White Park Broadcasting
 KCGL 104.1 (Classic rock), Big Horn Radio Network
 KWHO 107.1  (80s, 90s & Beyond), White Park Broadcasting

Television
 KTVQ - (CBS) from Billings
 KULR - (NBC) from Billings
 K19LM-D - (PBS) - (translator for KCWC-DT in Lander)

Newspaper
Twice-weekly Cody Enterprise. Founded by "Buffalo Bill" Cody and Col. John Peake in August 1899. The paper has a paid circulation of 7,050, and is owned by SAGE Publishing of Cody.

Transportation

Highways
    - North Fork Highway Westbound / Greybull Highway Eastbound
 U.S. 14, U.S. 16 and U.S. 20 run concurrently through Cody.
  - Powell Highway
  - Belfry highway northbound / Meeteetse highway southbound
  - South Fork Road

Airport
The Yellowstone Regional Airport offers full passenger service. Flights are available through SkyWest (United Airlines), connecting through Denver, Colorado. Air cargo services are provided by FedEx and UPS.

Ground transit
Cody has four bus transit companies: Cody Over Land Transit, Phidippides Shuttle Service, Cody Town Taxi, and the Cody Shuttle. Cody Over Land operates routes within the city of Cody, from June through September.  Phidippides is a full service transportation company with service to Cody, Yellowstone National Park, and airports in Cody, Jackson, and Billings. They also have courier and package service available. Cody Town Taxi and Cody Shuttle operate primarily in Cody.

Railroad
The branch terminates in Cody near where WY-120 crosses the Shoshone River.

Notable people 
 Eric Bischoff (born 1955), Professional wrestling personality; former president of World Championship Wrestling
 Larry Echo Hawk (born 1948), former attorney general of Idaho, member of the Idaho House of Representatives, tenth Assistant Secretary of the Interior for Indian Affairs, and current member of the First Quorum of the Seventy of the Church of Jesus Christ of Latter-day Saints; born in Cody
 Laura Bell, author
 Luke Bell (1990-2022), country musician and singer-songwriter, raised in Cody
 William Frederick Cody (1846–1917) a.k.a. "Buffalo Bill", American scout, bison hunter, showman
 William Robertson Coe (1869–1955), owner of Buffalo Bill's hunting camp, Irma Lake Lodge; a Cody and Wyoming benefactor
 Frank Tenney Johnson (1874–1939), a western artist who had his painting studio in Cody from 1931 to 1939
 Mike Leach (born 1961, died 2022) Former Mississippi State University head football coach
 John Linebaugh, gunsmith; cartridge inventor
 Jackson Pollock (1912–1956) — Abstract expressionist painter
 Alan K. Simpson (born 1931), former U.S. Senator
 Colin M. Simpson (born 1959), former Wyoming State Representative and Speaker of the House
 Milward Simpson (1897–1993), former Governor of Wyoming; former U.S. Senator
 Pete Simpson (born 1930), historian; former state representative from Sheridan County; former administrator at the University of Wyoming
 Mark Spragg (born 1952), author
 Craig L. Thomas (1933–2007), former United States Senator from Wyoming

Sister cities
  Lanchkhuti, Georgia

See also
 List of municipalities in Wyoming
 Angling in Yellowstone National Park

References

^20 "Kanye, Out West: What is the Superstar doing out in Wyoming?" New York Times, Style section, 23 Feb 2020. Retrieved October 26, 2020. https://www.nytimes.com/2020/02/23/style/kanye-west-cody-wyoming.html

External links

 City website
 Chamber of commerce
 Park County Archives

 
Cities in Wyoming
County seats in Wyoming
Cities in Park County, Wyoming